Residency or postgraduate training is a stage of graduate medical education. It refers to a qualified physician (one who holds the degree of MD, DO, MBBS, MBChB), veterinarian (DVM or VMD), dentist (DDS or DMD) or podiatrist (DPM) who practices medicine, veterinary medicine, dentistry, or podiatry, respectively, usually in a hospital or clinic, under the direct or indirect supervision of a senior medical clinician registered in that specialty such as an attending physician or consultant. In many jurisdictions, successful completion of such training is a requirement in order to obtain an unrestricted license to practice medicine, and in particular a license to practice a chosen specialty. In the meantime they practice "on" the license of their supervising physician. An individual engaged in such training may be referred to as a resident, registrar or trainee depending on the jurisdiction. Residency training may be followed by fellowship or sub-specialty training.

Whereas medical school teaches physicians a broad range of medical knowledge, basic clinical skills, and supervised experience practicing medicine in a variety of fields, medical residency gives in-depth training within a specific branch of medicine.

Terminology
A resident physician is more commonly referred to as a resident, senior house officer (in Commonwealth countries), or alternatively, a senior resident medical officer or house officer. Residents have graduated from an accredited medical school and hold a medical degree (MD, DO, MBBS, MBChB). Residents are, collectively, the house staff of a hospital. This term comes from the fact that resident physicians traditionally spend the majority of their training "in house" (i.e., the hospital).

Duration of residencies can range from three years to seven years, depending upon the program and specialty. A year in residency begins between late June and early July depending on the individual program and ends one calendar year later.

In the United States, the first year of residency is known as an internship with those physicians being termed interns. Depending on the number of years a specialty requires, the term junior resident may refer to residents that have not completed half their residency. Senior residents are residents in their final year of residency, although this can vary. Some residency programs refer to residents in their final year as chief residents (typically in surgical branches). Alternatively, a chief resident may describe a resident who has been selected to extend his or her residency by one year and organize the activities and training of the other residents (typically in internal medicine and pediatrics). In dermatology generally one of the final year residents is chosen as chief, to add administrative duties to the normal learning in the last year.

If a physician finishes a residency and decides to further his or her education in a fellowship, they are referred to as a "fellow". Physicians who have fully completed their training in a particular field are referred to as attending physicians, or consultants (in Commonwealth countries). However, the above nomenclature applies only in educational institutes in which the period of training is specified in advance. In privately owned, non-training hospitals, in certain countries, the above terminology may reflect the level of responsibility held by a physician rather than their level of education.

History
Residency as an opportunity for advanced training in a medical or surgical specialty evolved in the late 19th century from brief and informal programs for extra training in a special area of interest. The first formal residency programs were established by Sir William Osler and William Stewart Halsted at the Johns Hopkins Hospital. Residencies elsewhere then became formalized and institutionalized for the principal specialties in the early 20th century. But even mid-century, residency was not seen as necessary for general practice and only a minority of primary care physicians participated. By the end of the 20th century in North America though, very few new doctors went directly from medical school into independent, unsupervised medical practice, and more state and provincial governments began requiring one or more years of postgraduate training for medical licensure.

Residencies are traditionally hospital-based, and in the middle of the twentieth century, residents would often live (or "reside") in hospital-supplied housing. "Call" (night duty in the hospital) was sometimes as frequent as every second or third night for up to three years. Pay was minimal beyond room, board, and laundry services. It was assumed that most young men and women training as physicians had few obligations outside of medical training at that stage of their careers.

The first year of practical patient-care-oriented training after medical school has long been termed "internship". Even as late as the middle of the twentieth century, most physicians went into primary care practice after a year of internship. Residencies were separate from internship, often served at different hospitals, and only a minority of physicians did residencies.

Afghanistan 
In Afghanistan, the residency (Dari, تخصص) consists of a three to seven years of practical and research activities in the field selected by the candidate. The graduate medical students do not need to complete the residency because they study medicine in six years (three years for clinical subjects, three years clinical subjects in hospital) and one-year internship and they graduate as general practitioner. Most students do not complete residency because it is too competitive.

Argentina
In Argentina, the residency (Spanish, residencia) consists of a three to four years of practical and research activities in the field selected by both the candidate and already graduated medical practitioners.  Specialized fields such as neurosurgery or cardio-thoracic surgery require longer training. Through these years, consisting of internships, social services, and occasional research, the resident is classified according to their residency year as an R1, R2, R3 or R4. After the last year, the "R3 or R4 Resident" obtains the specialty (especialidad) in the selected field of medicine.

Australia

In Australia, specialist training is undertaken as a registrar; The term 'resident' is used synonymously with 'hospital medical officer' (HMO), and refers to unspecialised postgraduate medical practitioners prior to specialty training.

Entry into a specialist training program occurs after completing one year as an intern (post-graduate year 1 or "PGY1"), then, for many training programs, an additional year as a resident (PGY2 onward). 
Training lengths can range from 3 years for general practice to 7 years for paediatric surgery.

Canada
In Canada, Canadian medical graduates (CMGs), which includes final-year medical students and unmatched previous-year medical graduates, apply for residency positions via the Canadian Resident Matching Service (CaRMS). The first year of residency training is known as "Postgraduate Year 1" (PGY1).

CMGs can apply to many post-graduate medical training programs including family medicine, emergency medicine, internal medicine, pediatrics, general surgery, obstetrics-gynecology, neurology, and psychiatry, amongst others.

Some residency programs are direct entry (family medicine, dermatology, neurology, general surgery, etc.), meaning that CMGs applying to these specialties do so directly from medical school. Other residencies have sub-specialty matches (internal medicine and pediatrics) where residents complete their first 2–3 years before completing a secondary match (Medicine subspecialty match (MSM) or Pediatric subspecialty match (PSM)). After this secondary match has been completed, residents are referred to as fellows. Some areas of subspecialty matches include cardiology, nephrology, gastroenterology, immunology, respirology, infectious diseases, rheumatology, endocrinology and more. Direct entry specialties also have fellowships, but they are completed at the end of residency (typically 5 years).

Colombia
In Colombia, fully licensed physicians are eligible to compete for seats in residency programs. To be fully licensed, one must first finish a medical training program that usually lasts five to six years (varies between universities), followed by one year of medical and surgical internship. During this internship a national medical qualification exam is required, and, in many cases, an additional year of unsupervised medical practice as a social service physician. Applications are made individually program by program, and are followed by a postgraduate medical qualification exam. The scores during medical studies, university of medical training, curriculum vitae, and, in individual cases, recommendations are also evaluated. The acceptance rate into residencies is very low (~1–5% of applicants in public university programs), physician-resident positions do not have salaries, and the tuition fees reach or surpass US$10,000 per year in private universities and $2,000 in public universities. For the reasons mentioned above, many physicians travel abroad (mainly to Argentina, Brazil, Spain and the United States) to seek postgraduate medical training. The duration of the programs varies between three and six years. In public universities, and some private universities, it is also required to write and defend a medical thesis before receiving a specialist degree.

France

In France, students attending clinical practice are known as "externes" and newly qualified practitioners training in hospitals are known as "internes". The residency, called "Internat", lasts from three to six years (it depends on the speciality) and follows a competitive national ranking examination. It is customary to delay submission of a thesis. As in most other European countries, many years of practice at a junior level may follow.

French residents are often called "doctor" during their residency. Literally speaking, they are still students and become M.D. only at the end of their residency and after submitting and defending a thesis before a jury.

Greece
In Greece, licensed physicians are eligible to apply for a position in a residency program. To be a licensed physician, one must finish a medical training program which in Greece lasts for six years. A one-year obligatory rural medical service (internship) is necessary to complete the residency training. Applications are made individually in the prefecture where the hospital is located, and the applicants are positioned on first-come, first-served basis. The duration of the residency programs varies between three and seven years.

India

In India, after completing MBBS degree and one year of integrated internship, doctors can enroll in several types of postgraduate training programs: 
D.M. (DOCTOR OF MEDICINE) in: Cardiology, Endocrinology, Medical Gastroenterology, Nephrology, and Neurology.
M.Ch. (MASTER OF CHIRURGIE) in: Cardio vascular & Thoracic Surgery, Urology, Neurosurgery, Paediatric Surgery, Plastic Surgery. 
M.D. (DOCTOR OF MEDICINE) in: Anesthesiology, Anatomy, Biochemistry, Community Medicine, Dermatology Venereology and Leprosy, General Medicine, Forensic Medicine, Microbiology, Pathology, Paediatrics, Pharmacology, Physical medicine and rehabilitation, Physiology,  Psychiatry, Radio diagnosis, Radiotherapy, Tropical Medicine, and, Tuberculosis & Respiratory Medicine. 
M.S. (MASTER OF SURGERY) in: Otorhinolaryngology, General Surgery, Ophthalmology, Orthopaedics, Obstetrics & Gynecology. 
Or diploma in: Anesthesiology (D.A.), Clinical Pathology (D.C.P.), Dermatology Venereology and Leprosy (DDVL), Forensic Medicine (D.F.M.), Obstetrics & Gynaecology  (D.G.O.), Ophthalmology (D.O.), Orthopedics (D.Ortho.), Otorhinolaryngology (D.L.O.), Paediatrics (D.C.H.) Psychiatry (D.P.M.), Public health (D.P.H.), Radio-diagnosis (D.M.R.D.), Radiotherapy (D.M.R.T.)., Tropical Medicine & Health (D.T.M. & H.), Tuberculosis & Chest Diseases (D.T.C.D.), Industrial Health (D.I.H.), Maternity & Child Welfare (D. M. C. W.)

Mexico

In Mexico physicians need to take the ENARM (National Test for Aspirants to Medical Residency) (Spanish, Examen Nacional de Aspirantes a Residencias Medicas) in order to have a chance for a medical residency in the field they wish to specialize. The physician is allowed to apply to only one speciality each year. Some 35,000 physicians apply and only 8000 are selected. The selected physicians bring their certificate of approval to the hospital that they wish to apply (Almost all the hospitals for medical residency are from government based institutions). The certificate is valid only once per year and if the resident decides to drop residency and try to enter to a different speciality she will need to take the test one more time (no limit of attempts). All the hosting hospitals are affiliated to a public/private university and this institution is the responsible to give the degree of "specialist". This degree is unique but equivalent to the MD used in the UK and India. In order to graduate, the trainee is required to present a thesis project and defend it.

The length of the residencies is very similar to the American system. The residents are divided per year (R1, R2, R3, etc.). After finishing the trainee may decide if he wants to sub-specialize (equivalency to fellowship) and the usual length of sub-specialty training ranges from two to four years. In Mexico the term "fellow" is not used.

The residents are paid by the hosting hospital, about US$1000–1100 (paid in Mexican pesos). Foreign physicians do not get paid and indeed are required to pay an annual fee of $1000 to the university institution that the hospital is affiliated with. 

All the specialties in Mexico are board certified and some of them have a written and an oral component, making these boards ones of the most competitive in Latin America.

Pakistan

In Pakistan, after completing MBBS degree and further completing one year house job, doctors can enroll in two types of postgraduate residency programs. First is MS/MD program run by various medical universities throughout the country. It is a 4–5-year program depending upon the specialty. Second is fellowship program which is called Fellow of College of Physicians and Surgeons Pakistan (FCPS) by the College of Physicians and Surgeons Pakistan (CPSP). It is also a 4–5-year program depending upon the specialty.

There are also post-fellowship programs offered by the College of Physicians and Surgeons Pakistan as a second fellowship in subspecialties.

Spain
All Spanish medical degree holders need to pass a competitive national exam (named 'MIR') in order to access the specialty training program. This exam gives them the opportunity to choose both the specialty and the hospital where they will train, among the hospitals in the Spanish Healthcare Hospital Network. Currently, medical specialties last from 4 to 5 years.

There are plans to change the training program system to one similar to the UK's. There have been some talks between Ministry of Health, the Medical College of Physicians and the Medical Student Association but it is not clear how this change process is going to be.

Sweden

Prerequisites for applying to a specialist training program

A physician practicing in Sweden may apply to a specialist training program after being licensed as a physician by The National Board of Health and Welfare. To obtain a license through the Swedish education system a candidate must go through several steps. First the candidate must successfully finish a five-and-a-half-year undergraduate program, made up of two years of pre-clinical studies and three and a half years of clinical postings, at one of Sweden's seven medical schools—Uppsala University, Lund University, The Karolinska Institute, The University of Gothenburg, Linköping University, Umeå University, or Örebro University—after which a degree of Master of Science in Medicine is awarded. The degree makes the physician eligible for an internship ranging between 18 and 24 months, depending on the place of employment.

The internship is regulated by the National Board of Health and Welfare and regardless of place of employment it is made up of four main postings with a minimum of nine months divided between internal medicine and surgery—with no less than three months in each posting—three months in psychiatry, and six months in general practice. It is customary for many hospitals to post interns for an equal amount of time in surgery and internal medicine (e.g. six months in each of the two). An intern is expected to care for patients with a certain degree of independence but is under the supervision of more senior physicians who may or may not be on location.

During each clinical posting the intern is evaluated by senior colleagues and is, if deemed having skills corresponding to the goals set forth by The National Board of Health and Welfare, passed individually on all four postings and may go on to take a written exam on common case presentations in surgery, internal medicine, psychiatry, and general practice.

After passing all four main postings of the internship and the written exam, the physician may apply to The National Board of Health and Welfare to be licensed as a Doctor of Medicine. Upon application the physician has to pay a licensing fee of SEK 2,300—approximately equivalent to EUR 220 or USD 270, as per exchange rates on 24 April 2018—out of pocket, as it is not considered to be an expense directly related to medical school and thus is not covered by the state.

Physicians who have a foreign medical degree may apply for a license through different paths, depending on whether they are licensed in another EU or EEA country or not.

Specialty Selection

The Swedish medical specialty system is, as of 2015, made up of three different types of specialties; base specialties, subspecialties, and add-on specialties. Every physician wishing to specialize starts by training in a base specialty and can thereafter go on to train in a subspecialty specific to their base specialty. Add-on specialties also require previous training in a base specialty or subspecialty but are less specific in that they, unlike subspecialties, can be entered into through several different previous specialties.

Furthermore, the base specialties are grouped into eight classes—pediatric specialties, imaging and functional medicine specialties, independent base specialties, internal medicine specialties, surgical specialties, laboratory specialties, neurological specialties, and psychiatric specialties.

It is a requirement that all base specialty training programs are at least five years in length. Common reasons for base specialty training taking longer than five years is paternity or maternity leave or simultaneous Ph.D. studies.

Base specialties and subspecialties

Add-on Specialties

Allergology
To train in the add-on specialty of allergology a physician must first be a specialist in general practice, occupational and environmental medicine, pediatric allergology, endocrinology and diabetology, geriatrics, hematology, dermatology and venerology, internal medicine, cardiology, clinical immunology and transfusion medicine, pulmonology, medical gastroenterology and hepatology, nephrology or otorhinolaryngology.

Occupational medicine
To train in the add-on specialty of occupational medicine a physician must first be a specialist in one of the pediatric class specialties, one of the independent class specialties (excluding clinical pharmacology, clinical genetics, forensic medicine, and social medicine), one of the internal medicine class specialties, one of the neurological class specialties (excluding clinical neurophysiology) or one of the psychiatric class specialties.

Addiction medicine
To train in the add-on specialty of addiction medicine a physician must first be a specialist in pediatric psychiatry or psychiatry.

Gynecologic oncology
To train in the add-on specialty of gynecologic oncology a physician must first be a specialist in obstetrics and gynecology or oncology.

Nuclear medicine
To train in the add-on specialty of nuclear medicine a physician must first be a specialist in clinical physiology, oncology or radiology.

Palliative medicine
To train in the add-on specialty of palliative medicine a physician must first be a specialist in one of the pediatric class specialties, one of the independent class specialties (excluding occupational and environmental medicine, clinical pharmacology, clinical genetics, forensic medicine, and social medicine), one of the internal medicine class specialties, one of the surgical class specialties, one of the neurological class specialties (excluding clinical neurophysiology) or one of the psychiatric class specialties.

School health
To train in the add-on specialty of school health a physician must first be a specialist in general practice, pediatrics or pediatric psychiatry.

Pain medicine
To train in the add-on specialty of pain medicine a physician must first be a specialist in one of the pediatric class specialties, one of the independent class specialties (excluding clinical pharmacology, clinical genetics, forensic medicine, and social medicine), one of the internal medicine class specialties, one of the surgical class specialties, one of the neurological class specialties (excluding clinical neurophysiology) or one of the psychiatric class specialties.

Infection control
To train in the add-on specialty of infection control a physician must first be a specialist in infectious diseases or clinical microbiology.

Geriatric psychiatry
To train in the add-on specialty of geriatric psychiatry a physician must first be a specialist in geriatrics or psychiatry.

Application process

There is no centralized selection process for internship or residency positions. The application process is more similar to that of other jobs on the market—i.e. application via cover letter and curriculum vitae. Both types of positions are however usually publicly advertised and many hospitals have nearly synchronous recruitment processes once or twice per year—the frequency of recruitment depending mainly on hospital size—for their internship positions.

Factors

Apart from the requirement that candidates are graduates from approved medical programs and, in the case of residency, licensed as medical doctors, there are no specific criteria an employer has to consider in hiring for an internship or residency position. This system for recruiting has been criticized by The Swedish Medical Association for lacking transparency as well as for delaying time to specialist certification of physicians.

There are nevertheless factors that most employers will consider, the most important being how long a doctor has been in active practice. After completing nine out of a total of eleven semesters of medical school a student may work as a physician on a temporary basis—e.g. during summer breaks from university. This rule enables medical graduates to start working as physicians upon graduating from university without yet being licensed, as a way of building experience to be able to eventually be hired into an internship. According to a 2017 survey by The Swedish Medical Association, interns in the country as a whole had worked an average of 10.3 months as physicians before starting their internships, ranging from an average of 5.1 months for interns in the Dalarna region to an average of 19.8 months for interns in the Stockholm region.

In recruitment for residency positions less emphasis is often placed on the number of months a candidate has worked after finishing their internship, but it is common for physicians to work for some time in between internship and residency, much in the same way as between medical school and internship.

Thailand 
In Thailand, postgraduate medical training is monitored by the Medical Council of Thailand (TMC) and conducted by their respective "Royal Colleges". 

Thailand has a significant issue with an imbalance of medical personnel between Bangkok and the remaining 76 provinces. As a primate city, the majority of specialists wish to remain in Bangkok after training. Each year, the TMC outlines the requirements for application to a certain specialty, depending on the needs of the country for staff within that field. Specialities are therefore classified into tiers depending on national demand. The duration spent in internship depends on the specialty the graduate wishes to study. Specialties classified as 'lacking' may require only one year of internship, whilst more competitive specialties often require the full three-year duration of internship to meet the application criteria. Fields classified as 'severely lacking' may not require internship training at all.

Application to residency may be done on contract with a government hospital or without a contract, namely 'free-training'. Government hospitals may sign contracts to sponsor residency training for specialist doctors they require. In these cases, the duration for internship required in more popular fields may be reduced. For example, a residency in internal medicine requires three years of internship if applying without contract, but is reduced to two years if applying under contract. However at the end of training, specialists under contract must return to work at that particular hospital for a minimum of the duration of residency.

Most residency programs in Thailand consist of three to four years of training. The duration of training may be up to five or six years in certain specialties. Applications are sent to the Royal College overseeing their desired specialty and candidates may apply to no more than five institutes that conduct training in that specialty. As of 2022, there were 40 base specialties and 49 subspecialties. Subspecialty training (fellowship) requires initial training in the respective base specialty.

Base specialties and subspecialties

United Kingdom

History
In the United Kingdom, house officer posts used to be optional for those going into general practice, but almost essential for progress in hospital medicine. The Medical Act 1956 made satisfactory completion of one year as house officer necessary to progress from provisional to full registration as a medical practitioner. The term "intern" was not used by the medical profession, but the general public were introduced to it by the US television series Dr. Kildare. They were usually called "housemen", but the term "resident" was also used unofficially. In some hospitals the "resident medical officer" (RMO) (or "resident surgical officer" etc.) was the most senior of the live-in medical staff of that specialty.

The pre-registration house officer posts lasted six months, and it was necessary to complete one surgical and one medical post. Obstetrics could be substituted for either. In principle, general practice in a "Health Centre" was also allowed, but this was almost unheard of. The posts did not have to be in general medicine: some teaching hospitals had very specialised posts at this level, so it was possible for a new graduate to do neurology plus neurosurgery or orthopaedics plus rheumatology, for one year before having to go onto more broadly based work. The pre-registration posts were nominally supervised by the General Medical Council, which in practice delegated the task to the medical schools, who left it to the consultant medical staff. The educational value of these posts varied enormously.

On-call work in the early days was full time, with frequent night shifts and weekends on call. One night in two was common, and later one night in three. This meant weekends on call started at 9 am on Friday and ended at 5 pm on Monday (80 hours). Less acute specialties such as dermatology could have juniors permanently on call. The European Union's Working Time Directive conflicted with this: at first the UK negotiated an opt-out for some years, but working hours needed reform. On call time was unpaid until 1975 (the year of the house officers' one-day strike), and for a year or two depended on certification by the consultant in charge – a number of them refused to sign. On call time was at first paid at 30% of the standard rate. Before paid on call was introduced, there would be several house officers "in the house" at any one time and the "second on call" house officer could go out, provided they kept the hospital informed of their telephone number at all times.

A "pre-registration house officer" would go on to work as a "senior house officer" for at least one year before seeking a registrar post. SHO posts could last six months to a year, and junior doctors often had to travel around the country to attend interviews and move house every six months while constructing their own training scheme for general practice or hospital specialisation. Locum posts could be much shorter. Organised schemes were a later development, and do-it-yourself training rotations became rare in the 1990s. Outpatients were not usually a junior house officer's responsibility, but such clinics formed a large part of the workload of more senior trainees, often with little real supervision.

Registrar posts lasted one or two years, and sometimes much longer outside an academic setting. It was common to move from one registrar post to another. Fields such as psychiatry and radiology used to be entered at the registrar stage, but the other registrars would usually have passed part one of a higher qualification, such as a Royal College membership or fellowship before entering that grade. Part two (the complete qualification) was necessary before obtaining a senior registrar post, usually linked to a medical school, but many left hospital practice at this stage rather than wait years to progress to a consultant post.

Most British clinical diplomas (requiring one or two years' experience) and membership or fellowship exams were not tied to particular training grades, though the length of training and nature of experience might be specified. Participation in an approved training scheme was required by some of the royal colleges. The sub-specialty exams in surgery, now for Fellowship of the Royal College of Surgeons, were originally limited to senior registrars. These rules prevented many of those in non-training grades from qualifying to progress.

Once a Senior Registrar, depending on specialty, it could take anything from one to six years to go onto a permanent consultant or senior lecturer appointment. It might be necessary to obtain an M.D. or Ch. M. degree and to have substantial published research. Transfer to general practice or a less favoured specialty could be made at any stage along this pathway: Lord Moran famously referred to general practitioners as those who had "fallen off the ladder".

There were also permanent non-training posts at sub-consultant level: previously senior hospital medical officer and medical assistant (both obsolete) and now staff grade, specialty doctor and associate specialist. The regulations did not call for much experience or any higher qualifications, but in practice both were common, and these grades had high proportions of overseas graduates, ethnic minorities and women.

Research fellows and PhD candidates were often clinical assistants, but a few were senior or specialist registrars. A large number of "Trust Grade" posts had been created by the new NHS trusts for the sake of the routine work, and many juniors had to spend time in these posts before moving between the new training grades, although no educational or training credit was given for them. Holders of these posts might work at various levels, sharing duties with a junior or middle grade practitioner or with a consultant.

Post 2005
The structure of medical training was reformed in 2005 when the Modernising Medical Careers (MMC) reform programme was instituted. House officers and the first year of senior house officer jobs were replaced by a compulsory two-year foundation training programme, followed by competitive entry into a formal specialty-based training programme. Registrar and Senior Registrar grades had been merged in 1995/6 as the specialist registrar (SpR) grade (entered after a longer period as a senior house officer, after obtaining a higher qualification, and lasting up to six years), with regular local assessments panels playing a major role. Following MMC these posts were replaced by StRs, who may be in post up to eight years, depending on the field.

The structure of the training programmes vary with specialty but there are five broad categories:
 Themed core specialties (A&E, ITU and anaesthetics)
 Surgical specialties
 Medical specialties
 Psychiatry
 Run-through specialties (e.g. general practice, clinical radiology, pathology, paediatrics)

The first four categories all run on a similar structure: the Trainee first completes a two-year structured and broad-based core training programme in that field (such as core medical training) which makes them eligibile for competitive entry into an associated specialty training scheme (e.g.  gastroenterology if core medical training has been completed). The Core training years are referred to as CT1 and CT2, and the specialist years are ST3 onwards until completing training. Core training and the first year or two of speciality training are equivalent to the old Senior House Officer jobs.

It is customary for trainees in these areas to sit their Membership examinations (such as the Royal College of Physicians (MRCP), or the Royal College of Surgeons (MRCS)) in order to progress and compete for designated sub-specialty training programmes that attract a national training number as specialty training year 3 (ST3) and beyond – up to ST 9 depending on the particular training specialty.

In the 5th category, the trainee immediately starts specialty training (ST1 instead of CT1) progressing up to Consultant level without break or further competitive application process (run-through training). Most of the run-through schemes are in stand-alone specialties (such as radiology, public health or histopathology), but there are also a few traditionally surgical specialities which can be entered directly without completing core surgical training – neurosurgery, obstetrics & gynaecology and ophthalmology. The length of this training varies, for example general practice is 3 years while radiology is 5 years.

The UK grade equivalent of a US fellow in medical/surgical sub-specialties is the specialty registrar (ST3–ST9) grade of sub-specialty training, but while US fellowship programmes are generally 2–3 years in duration after completing the residency, UK trainees spend 4–7 years. This generally includes service provision in the main specialty; this discrepancy lies in the competing demands of NHS service provision, and UK postgraduate training stipulating that even specialist registrars must be able to accommodate the general acute medical take—almost equivalent to what dedicated attending internists perform in the United States (they still remain minimally supervised for these duties).

United States

Medical licensure in the United States is governed by individual state boards of medicine. In most states, graduates of U.S. medical schools may obtain a full medical license after passage of the third step of the USMLE, and at least one year of postgraduate education (i.e., one year of residency; usually called an internship However, in most states, International medical graduates are required longer periods of training as well as passage of the third and final step of the USMLE, to obtain a full medical license. Those in residency programs who have full medical licenses may practice medicine without supervision ("moonlight") in settings such as urgent care centers and rural hospitals. However, while performing the requirements of their residency, residents are supervised by attending physicians who must approve their decisions.

Specialty selection
Specialties differ in length of training, availability of residencies, and options. Specialist residency programs require participation for completion ranging from three years for family medicine to seven years for neurosurgery. This time does not include any fellowship that may be required to be completed after residency to further sub-specialize. In regard to options, specialty residency programs can range nationally from over 700 (family medicine) and over 580 (internal medicine) to 33 programs for integrated thoracic surgery and 28 programs for Osteopathic neuromusculoskeletal medicine. In 2022 there were 11583 internal medicine positions (around 9000 categorical, 1850 preliminary, and 450 primary care positions) compared with 9489 in 2017. Second largest specialty - family medicine shows 46% grows with 4916 positions in 2022 compared with 3356 in 2017, while just 522 (492 advanced, 30 categorical) dermatology positions compared with 449 (423 advanced, 36 categorical) in 2017. 

Residents choose the teaching hospital where they want to perform their residency based upon many factors, including the medical specialties offered by the hospital and reputation and credentials of the hospital.  The following table shows medical specialties and the residency training times for medical specialties, as reported by the American Medical Association in 2021.

Application process

Factors
There are many factors that can go into what makes an applicant more or less competitive. According to a survey of residency program directors by the NRMP in 2020, the following five factors were mentioned by directors over 75% of the time as having the most impact:

Between 60% and 75% also mentioned other factors such as core clerkship grades, perceived commitment to specialty, Audition elective/rotation within your department, any failed attempt in USMLE, class ranking/quartile, personal prior knowledge of the applicant, perceived interest in program and passing USMLE Step 2 CS.

These factors often come as a surprise to many students in the preclinical years, who often work very hard to get great grades, but do not realize that only 45% of directors cite basic science performance as an important measure.

Written
Applicants begin the application process with ERAS (regardless of their matching program) at the beginning of their fourth and final year in medical school.

At this point, students choose specific residency programs to apply for that often specify both specialty and hospital system, sometimes even subtracks (e.g., Internal Medicine Residency Categorical Program at Mass General or San Francisco General Primary Care Track).

After they apply to programs, programs review applications and invite selected candidates for interviews held between October and February. As of 2016, schools can view applications starting 1 Oct.

Interviews
The interview process involves separate interviews at hospitals around the country. Frequently, the individual applicant pays for travel and lodging expenses, but some programs may subsidize applicants' expenses.

International medical students may participate in a residency program within the United States as well but only after completing a program set forth by the Educational Commission for Foreign Medical Graduates (ECFMG). Through its program of certification, the ECFMG assesses the readiness of international medical graduates to enter residency or fellowship programs in the United States that are accredited by the Accreditation Council for Graduate Medical Education (ACGME). The ECFMG does not have jurisdiction over Canadian M.D. programs, which the relevant authorities consider to be fully equivalent to U.S. medical schools. In turn, this means that Canadian MD graduates, if they can obtain the required visas (or are already US citizens or permanent residents), can participate in US residency programs on the same footing as US graduates.

The match

Ranking
Access to graduate medical training programs such as residencies is a competitive process known as "the Match". After the interview period is over, students submit a "rank-order list" to a centralized matching service that depends on the residency program they are applying for:

 most specialties – the National Resident Matching Program (NRMP) by February (the AOA match used to be a separate option for DOs but was merged with the NRMP match after 2020)
 Urology Residency Match Program
 SF Match (Ophth/ Plastics)

Similarly, residency programs submit a list of their preferred applicants in rank order to this same service. The process is blinded, so neither applicant nor program will see each other's list. Aggregate program rankings can be found here, and are tabulated in real time based on applicants' anonymously submitted rank lists.

The two parties' lists are combined by an NRMP computer, which creates stable (a proxy for optimal) matches of residents to programs using an algorithm. On the third Friday of March each year ("Match Day") these results are announced in Match Day ceremonies at the nation's 155 U.S. medical schools. By entering the Match system, applicants are contractually obligated to go to the residency program at the institution to which they were matched. The same applies to the programs; they are obligated to take the applicants who matched into them.

Match Day
On the Monday of the week that contains the third Friday in March, candidates find out from the NRMP whether (but not where) they matched. If they have matched, they must wait until Match Day, which takes place on the following Friday, to find out where.

Supplemental Offer and Acceptance Program
The Supplemental Offer and Acceptance Program (SOAP) is a process for partially matched and fully unmatched applicant through the Match. Previous to the creation of SOAP, applicants were given the opportunity to contact the programs about the open positions in a process informally called "the scramble". This frantic, loosely structured system forced soon-to-be medical school graduates to choose within minutes programs not on their original Match list. In 2012, the NRMP introduced the organized system called SOAP. As part of the transition, Match Day was also moved from the third Thursday in March to the third Friday.

The SOAP occurs during Match week. First the applicants eligible for SOAP, are informed they did not secure a Match position on the Monday of Match Week. The locations of remaining unfilled residency positions are released to the unmatched applicants the following day. Then programs contact applicants for interviews that usually occur via phone calls. After that, programs prepare lists of applicants and the positions open are offered by each program one at a time to the top applicant on their list. The applicant may accept the offer or reject it. If the offer is rejected it will go to the next applicant in the program list during the next round of SOAP. During Match year 2021 there were four rounds of SOAP.

Changing residency
Inevitably, there will be discrepancies between the preferences of the student and programs. Students may be matched to programs very low on their rank list, especially when the highest priorities consist of competitive specialties like radiology, neurosurgery, plastic surgery, dermatology, ophthalmology, orthopedics, otolaryngology, radiation oncology, and urology. It is not unheard of for a student to go even a year or two in a residency and then switch to a new program.

A similar but separate osteopathic match previously existed, announcing its results in February, before the NRMP. However the osteopathic match is no longer available as the ACGME has now unified both into a single matching program. Osteopathic physicians (DOs) may participate in either match, filling either M.D. positions (traditionally obtained by physicians with the MD degree or international equivalent including the MBBS or MBChB degree) accredited by the Accreditation Council for Graduate Medical Education (ACGME), or DO positions previously accredited by the American Osteopathic Association (AOA).

Military residencies are filled in a similar manner as the NRMP but at a much earlier date (usually mid-December) to allow for students who did not match to proceed to the civilian system.

In 2000–2004, the matching process was attacked as anti-competitive by resident physicians represented by class-action lawyers. See, e.g., Jung v. Association of American Medical Colleges et al., 300 F.Supp.2d 119 (DDC 2004). Congress reacted by carving out a specific exception in antitrust law for medical residency. See Pension Funding Equity Act of 2004 § 207, Pub. L. No. 108-218, 118 Stat. 596 (2004) (codified at ). The lawsuit was later dismissed under the authority of the new act.

The matching process itself has also been scrutinized as limiting the employment rights of medical residents, namely whereupon acceptance of a match, medical residents pursuant to the matching rules and regulations are required to accept any and all terms and conditions of employment imposed by the health care facility, institution, or hospital.

The USMLE Step 1 or COMLEX Level 1 score is just one of many factors considered by residency programs in selecting applicants. Although it varies from specialty to specialty, Alpha Omega Alpha membership, clinical clerkship grades, letters of recommendation, class rank, research experience, and school of graduation are all considered when selecting future residents.

History of long hours

Medical residencies traditionally require lengthy hours of their trainees. Early residents literally resided at the hospitals, often working in unpaid positions during their education. During this time, a resident might always be "on call" or share that duty with just one other practitioner. More recently, 36-hour shifts were separated by 12 hours of rest, during 100+ hour weeks.  The American public, and the medical education establishment, recognized that such long hours were counter-productive, since sleep deprivation increases rates of medical errors.  This was noted in a landmark study on the effects of sleep deprivation and error rate in an intensive-care unit. The Accreditation Council for Graduate Medical Education (ACGME) has limited the number of work-hours to 80 hours weekly (averaged over 4 weeks), overnight call frequency to no more than one overnight every third day, and 10 hours off between shifts. Still, a review committee may grant exceptions for up to 10%, or a maximum of 88 hours, to individual programs. Until early 2017, duty periods for postgraduate year 1 could not exceed 16 hours per day, while postgraduate year 2 residents and those in subsequent years can have up to a maximum of 24 hours of continuous duty. After early 2017, all years of residents may work up to 24-hour shifts. While these limits are voluntary, adherence has been mandated for the purposes of accreditation, though lack of adherence to hour restrictions is not uncommon.

Most recently, the Institute of Medicine (IOM) built upon the recommendations of the ACGME in the December 2008 report Resident Duty Hours: Enhancing Sleep, Supervision and Safety. While keeping the ACGME's recommendations of an 80-hour work week averaged over 4 weeks, the IOM report recommends that duty hours should not exceed 16 hours per shift, unless an uninterrupted five-hour break for sleep is provided within shifts that last up to 30 hours. The report also suggests residents be given variable off-duty periods between shifts, based on the timing and duration of the shift, to allow residents to catch up on sleep each day and make up for chronic sleep deprivation on days off.

Critics of long residency hours trace the problem to the fact that a resident has no alternatives to positions that are offered, meaning residents must accept all conditions of employment, including very long work hours, and that they must also, in many cases, contend with poor supervision. This process, they contend, reduces the competitive pressures on hospitals, resulting in low salaries and long, unsafe work hours.

Supporters of traditional work hours contend that much may be learned in the hospital during the extended time. Some argue that it remains unclear whether patient safety is enhanced or harmed by a reduction in work hours which necessarily lead to more transitions in care. Some of the clinical work traditionally performed by residents has been shifted to other health care workers such as ward clerks, nurses, laboratory personnel, and phlebotomists. It has also resulted in a shift of some resident work toward home work, where residents will complete paperwork and other duties at home so as to not have to log the hours.

Adoption of working time restrictions
United States federal law places no limit on resident work hours. Regulatory and legislative attempts at limiting resident work hours have been proposed but have yet to be passed. Class action litigation on behalf of the 200,000 medical residents in the US has been another route taken to resolve the matter.

Dr. Richard Corlin, president of the American Medical Association, has called for re-evaluation of the training process, declaring "We need to take a look again at the issue of why the resident is there."

On 1 November 2002, an 80-hour work limit went into effect in residencies accredited by the American Osteopathic Association (AOA). The decision also mandates that interns and residents in AOA-approved programs may not work in excess of 24 consecutive hours exclusive of morning and noon educational programs. It does allow up to six hours for inpatient and outpatient continuity and transfer of care. However, interns and residents may not assume responsibility for a new patient after 24 hours.

The US Occupational Safety and Health Administration (OSHA) rejected a petition filed by the Committee of Interns & Residents/SEIU, a national union of medical residents, the American Medical Student Association, and Public Citizen that sought to restrict medical resident work hours. OSHA instead opted to rely on standards adopted by ACGME, a private trade association that represents and accredits residency programs. On 1 July 2003, the ACGME instituted standards for all accredited residency programs, limiting the workweek to 80 hours a week averaged over a period of four weeks. These standards have been voluntarily adopted by residency programs.

Though re-accreditation may be negatively impacted and accreditation suspended or withdrawn for program non-compliance, the number of hours worked by residents still varies widely between specialties and individual programs. Some programs have no self-policing mechanisms in place to prevent 100+ hour workweeks while others require residents to self-report hours. In order to effectuate complete, full, and proper compliance with maximum hour work hour standards, there are proposals to extend US federal whistle-blower protection to medical residents.

Criticisms of limiting the work week include disruptions in continuity of care and limiting training gained through involvement in patient care. Similar concerns have arisen in Europe, where the Working Time Directive limits doctors to 48 hours per week averaged out over a 6-month reference period.

Recently, there has been talk of reducing the work week further, to 57 hours. In the specialty of neurosurgery, some authors have suggested that surgical subspecialties may need to leave the ACGME and create their own accreditation process, because a decrease of this magnitude in resident work hours, if implemented, would compromise resident education and ultimately the quality of physicians in practice. In other areas of medical practice, like internal medicine, pediatrics, and radiology, reduced resident duty hours may be not only feasible but also advantageous to trainees because this more closely resembles the practice patterns of these specialties, though it has never been determined that trainees should work fewer hours than graduates.

In 2007, the Institute of Medicine was commissioned by Congress to study the impact of long hours on medical errors. New ACGME rules went into effect on 1 July 2011, limiting first-year residents to 16-hour shifts. The new ACGME rules were criticized in the journal Nature and Science of Sleep for failing to fully implement the IOM recommendations.

Research requirement
The Accreditation Council for Graduate Medical Education clearly states the following three points in the Common Program Requirements for Graduate Medical Education:
The curriculum must advance residents' knowledge of the basic principles of research, including how research is conducted, evaluated, explained to patients, and applied to patient care.
Residents should participate in scholarly activity.
The sponsoring institution and program should allocate adequate educational resources to facilitate resident involvement in scholarly activities.
Research remains a nonmandatory part of the curriculum, and many residency programs do not enforce the research commitment of their faculty, leading to a non-Gaussian distribution of the Research Productivity Scale.

Financing residency programs
The Department of Health and Human Services, primarily Medicare, funds the vast majority of residency training in the US. This tax-based financing covers resident salaries and benefits through payments called Direct Medical Education, or DME, payments. Medicare also uses taxes for Indirect Medical Education, or IME, payments, a subsidy paid to teaching hospitals that is tied to admissions of Medicare patients in exchange for training resident physicians in certain selected specialties. Overall funding levels, however, have remained frozen over the last ten years, creating a bottleneck in the training of new physicians in the US, according to the AMA. On the other hand, some argue that Medicare subsidies for training residents simply provide surplus revenue for hospitals, which recoup their training costs by paying residents salaries (roughly $45,000 per year) that are far below the residents' market value. Nicholson concludes that residency bottlenecks are not caused by a Medicare funding cap, but rather by Residency Review Committees (which approve new residencies in each specialty), which seek to limit the number of specialists in their field to maintain high incomes. In any case, hospitals trained residents long before Medicare provided additional subsidies for that purpose. A large number of teaching hospitals fund resident training to increase the supply of residency slots, leading to the modest 4% total growth in slots from 1998 to 2004.

Changes in postgraduate medical training
Many changes have occurred in postgraduate medical training in the last fifty years:
Nearly all physicians now serve a residency after graduation from medical school. In many states, full licensure for unrestricted practice is not available until graduation from a residency program. Residency is now considered standard preparation for primary care (what used to be called "general practice").
While physicians who graduate from osteopathic medical schools can choose to complete a one-year rotating clinical internship prior to applying for residency, the internship has been subsumed into residency for MD physicians. Many DO physicians do not undertake the rotating internship since it is now uncommon for any physician to take a year of internship before entering a residency, and the first year of residency training is now considered equivalent to an internship for most legal purposes. Certain specialties, such as ophthalmology, radiology, anesthesiology, and dermatology, still require prospective residents to complete an additional internship year, prior to starting their residency program training.
The number of distinct residencies has proliferated, and there are now dozens. For many years, the principal traditional residencies included internal medicine, pediatrics, general surgery, obstetrics and gynecology, neurology, ophthalmology, orthopaedics, neurosurgery, otolaryngology, urology, physical medicine and rehabilitation, and psychiatry. Some training once considered part of internship has also now been moved into the fourth year of medical school (called a subinternship) with significant basic science education being completed before a student even enters medical school (during their undergraduate education before medical school).
Pay has increased, but residency compensation continues to be considered extremely low when one considers the hours involved. The average annual salary of a first year resident is $45,000 for 80 hours a week of work, which translates to $11.25 an hour. This pay is considered a "living wage". Unlike most attending physicians (that is, those who are not residents), they do not take calls from home; they are usually expected to remain in the hospital for the entire shift.
Call hours have been greatly restricted. In July 2003, strict rules went into effect for all residency programs in the US, known to residents as the "work hours rules". Among other things, these rules limited a resident to no more than 80 hours of work in a week (averaged over four weeks), no more than 24 hours of clinical duties at a stretch with an additional 6 hours for transferring patient care and educational requirement (with no new patients in the last six), and call no more often than every third night. In-house call for most residents these days is typically one night in four; surgery and obstetrics residents are more likely to have one in three call. A few decades ago, in-house call every third night or every other night was the standard. While on paper, this has decreased hours, in many programs, there has been no decrease in resident work hours, only a decrease in hours recorded. Even though many sources cite that resident work hours have decreased, residents are commonly encouraged or forced to hide their work hours to appear to comply with the 80-hour limits.
For many specialties an increasing proportion of the training time is spent in outpatient clinics rather than on inpatient care. Since in-house call is usually reduced on these outpatient rotations, this also contributes to the overall decrease in the total number of on-call hours.
For all ACGME accredited programs since 2007, there was a call for adherence to ethical principles.

Residency salary

Resident compensation
Starting from the first year of postgraduate training residents receive compensation. In 2021 the average salary was $64,000. Salaries increased by $1,000 a year in average during past 10 years.  Salary strongly depends on the year of training with up to $8,000 increase every next year.  Overall, 43% of trainees were satisfied with their compensation.

Low hourly pay
Compared with other healthcare workers, resident hourly compensation is not high. "Given average resident salaries and an 80-hour work week, resident salaries equate to approximately $15 to $20/hour."

Following a successful residency

In Australia and New Zealand, it leads to eligibility for fellowship of the Royal Australasian College of Physicians, the Royal Australasian College of Surgeons, or a number of similar bodies.

In Canada, once medical doctors successfully complete their residency program, they become eligible for certification by the Royal College of Physicians and Surgeons of Canada or the College of Family Physicians of Canada (CFPC) if the residency program was in family medicine. Many universities now offer "enhanced skills" certifications in collaboration with the CFPC, allowing family physicians to receive training in various areas such as emergency medicine, palliative care, maternal and child health care, and hospital medicine. Additionally, successful graduates of the family medicine residency program can apply to the "Clinical Scholar Program" in order to be involved in family medicine research.

In Mexico, after finishing their residency, physicians obtain the degree of "Specialist", which renders them eligible for certification and fellowship, depending on the field of practice.

In South Africa, successful completion of residency leads to board certification as a specialist with the Health Professions Council and eligibility for fellowship of the Colleges of Medicine of South Africa.

In the United States, it leads to eligibility for board certification and membership/fellowship of several specialty colleges and academies.

See also
 International medical graduate
 William Osler
 Physician training
 Post graduate year annotation (PGY)
 Postdoctoral researcher
 Medical resident work hours
 Validation of foreign studies and degrees
Fellowship (medicine)
Attending physician

References

External links
The Accreditation Council for Graduate Medical Education in the United States
The American Osteopathic Association Accreditation for osteopathic residency
Educational Commission for Foreign Medical Graduates
Robert N. Wilkey, Federal Whistleblower Protection: A Means to Enforcing Maximum Hour Legislation for Medical Residents, William Mitchell Law Review, Vol. 30, Issue 1 (2003)

Medical education
Medical education in the United States
Physicians